SRFI may refer to:

 Scheme Requests for Implementation, an effort to coordinate libraries and extensions of the Scheme programming language
 Squash Racquets Federation of India, the apex body for the squash racquet sport in India